Rangalal Sen (24 September 193310 February 2014) was a Bangladesh academician and writer. In 2011, he was inducted as the National Professor of Bangladesh.

Early life
Sen was born into a Sylheti Hindu family in the village of Troilokkhobijoy, Kamalpur in South Sylhet.

Education
Sen completed his bachelor's and master's from the Department of Sociology at the University of Dhaka in 1962 and 1963 respectively. He then earned his PhD from Sussex University in England in 1977.

Career
In 1967 Sen joined Bangladesh University of Engineering and Technology as a lecturer. A year later, he joined the Department of Sociology of the University of Dhaka. He retired from the faculty position in 1993.

Sen had written a total of 23 books in English and Bengali.

References

1933 births
2014 deaths
People from Moulvibazar Sadar Upazila
National Professors of Bangladesh
Bangladeshi scholars
Bangladeshi male writers
Academic staff of Bangladesh University of Engineering and Technology
University of Dhaka alumni
Academic staff of the University of Dhaka
Alumni of the University of Sussex
Bengali Hindus